Levon Pachajyan (born 20 September 1983, in Yerevan, Soviet Union) is an Armenian football midfielder. He last played for the Swedish club Linköping City. He is a former member of the Armenia national team. Levon was voted as best Armenian footballer of 2007 season.

Club career
Pachajyan joined Swedish side GAIS in 2008 on a contract that ran until 2013. Norwegian team Fredrikstad FK loaned him for the period of 1 March – 31 July 2009. He debuted for Fredrikstad in a friendly match against IFK Göteborg on 19 February 2009. He made his debut in the Norwegian Tippeliga against Bodø/Glimt. The loan with Fredrikstad expired during the summer of 2009, and in September GAIS terminated his contract.

Club career Stats

 Assist Goals

International career
Pachajyan made his debut in an away friendly match against Hungary on 18 February 2004. He scored his first goal for Armenia on 28 May 2008 against Moldova in a friendly match and also assisted in another goal.

National team statistics

International goals

Achievements
Armenian Premier League with Pyunik Yerevan: 2003, 2004, 2005, 2006, 2007
Armenian Cup with Pyunik Yerevan: 2004
Armenian Supercup with Pyunik Yerevan: 2003, 2004, 2006

External links
 
 Levon lämnar GAIS ("Levon leaves GAIS"). gais.se. Accessed 16 September 2009.

References

1983 births
Living people
Armenian footballers
Armenia international footballers
Armenia under-21 international footballers
Armenian expatriate footballers
FC Pyunik players
GAIS players
Fredrikstad FK players
Sanat Naft Abadan F.C. players
Allsvenskan players
Superettan players
Eliteserien players
Azadegan League players
Expatriate footballers in Sweden
Expatriate footballers in Norway
Expatriate footballers in Iran
Armenian expatriate sportspeople in Sweden
Armenian expatriate sportspeople in Norway
Armenian expatriate sportspeople in Iran
Footballers from Yerevan
Armenian Premier League players
Association football midfielders
FC Linköping City players